San Marcos de Apalache Historic State Park is a Florida State Park in Wakulla County, Florida organized around the historic site of a Spanish colonial fort (known as Fort St. Marks by the English and Americans), which was used by succeeding nations that controlled the area. The Spanish first built wooden buildings and a stockade in the late 17th and early 18th centuries here, which were destroyed by a hurricane.

The stone fort was built beginning in 1753. It came under successive control by Great Britain, Spain, the United States and, lastly, the Confederacy during the American Civil War. A U.S. Marine Hospital was built from the materials of the fort. The US took control of the site again in 1865, and the fort site was abandoned.

On November 13, 1966, the fort area was designated a National Historic Landmark because of its significance and added to the U.S. National Register of Historic Places. Designated as a National Engineering Landmark, the fort site has been highlighted on the Florida Native American Heritage Trail.  On October 10, 1962, Congress authorized designating Fort Saint Marks as a National Historic Site upon donation of the site to the National Park Service.  That donation apparently never happened, however, and the site remains a Florida State Park and a National Historic Landmark.

The historic park is located in the vicinity of St. Marks, off S.R. 363, at 148 Old Fort Road.

History
In 1679, the Spanish built a wooden stockade at this site which they called San Marcos de Apalache. It was part of their colonial expansion in the northwestern Florida area. A settlement developed around the fort beginning about 1733. Another wooden structure was built about 1753. The wooden fort was destroyed and the garrison drowned, during a hurricane.

In 1759, the Spanish began to build a stone fort, designed to resist bombardment by ships. They abandoned it to Indians for use as a trading post after ceding this territory to the British following the defeat of France in the Seven Years' War, also known as the French and Indian War. The British had a garrison at the fort.

But, following the American Revolutionary War, the British traded some territory with Spain, which took over West and East Florida again. (St. Marks was in East Florida; the boundary was the Apalachicola River). Spanish forces reoccupied the San Marcos fort in 1783, and they strengthened its defenses. American settlers began penetrating the Southeast after the Revolution, settling deeper into Georgia and into the Mississippi and Alabama Territories.

General Andrew Jackson led some raids into this area during the Seminole Wars and had his forces seize the fort in 1818. The U.S. occupied it for nearly a year. The Fort St. Marks military cemetery was established at that time, for the burial of men who died at the garrison. A total of 19 men were buried in the cemetery; most died from diseases, including dysentery and consumption.

In 1821, the United States purchased the Floridas from Spain, including the fort site. In 1859, the federal government built a marine hospital here, using stones and other materials from the old fort. It provided care for sick seamen and area yellow fever victims.

During the Civil War, the Confederate army took over the fort, after Florida seceded from the Union.  U.S. forces regained control in 1865, in the last year of the war.

Remains of the stone fort are in evidence at the site. A museum and visitor center have been built on the foundation of the old hospital.  A stone well and a retaining wall have been reconstructed nearby, based on archeological documentation.

Recreational activities
The park has such amenities as hiking and picnicking areas.

See also

St. Marks, Florida
Apalachee Bay
St. Marks River
Wakulla River
Wakulla County, Florida - This article says Fort San Marcos was captured, early in the 19th century, by William Augustus Bowles of the short-lived State of Muskogee.
Negro Fort

References

Gallery

External links

 San Marcos de Apalache Historic State Park at Florida State Parks
 San Marcos de Apalache Historic State Park, at Explore Southern History, includes detailed information and photos of the park

Archaeological sites in Florida
State parks of Florida
Ward
National Historic Landmarks in Florida
Spanish colonization of the Americas
Spanish Florida
Parks in Wakulla County, Florida
Museums in Wakulla County, Florida
Military and war museums in Florida
History museums in Florida
Protected areas established in 1966
Florida Native American Heritage Trail
National Register of Historic Places in Wakulla County, Florida
1966 establishments in Florida
Archaeological sites on the National Register of Historic Places in Florida